The following is a list of railway stations belonging to Indian Railways in the state of Punjab, India.

A

B

D

F

G

H

J

K

L

M

N

P

R

S

T

U

V

See also 

Rail transport in India
Indian Railways

Notes

External links 

 

 
Punjab